Khairtabad Assembly constituency is a constituency of Telangana Legislative Assembly, India. It is one of 15 constituencies in Capital city of Hyderabad. It is part of Secunderabad Lok Sabha constituency.

Danam Nagender of Telangana Rashtra Party won from the Khairthabad constituency in 2018 Assembly Elections.

Extent of the constituency
The assembly constituency presently comprises the following neighbourhoods:

Members of Legislative Assembly 
Members of Legislative State Assembly, who represented Khairatabad in 2018.

Election results

Telangana Legislative Assembly election, 2018

Telangana Legislative Assembly election, 2014

Trivia
 Before Delimitation of Constituencies it is the constituency with largest voter base in the State.

See also
 Khairatabad
 List of constituencies of Telangana Legislative Assembly

References

Assembly constituencies of Telangana